Inflatostereum is a genus of two species of polypore fungi in the family Phanerochaetaceae. The genus was circumscribed by English mycologist Derek Reid in 1965.

References

Phanerochaetaceae
Polyporales genera
Taxa described in 1965
Taxa named by Derek Reid